Kpong Airfield first opened in November 2005.  It is the busiest private airfield in West Africa with active light aviation movements most days.  It has two grass runways 19/01 (800m) and 29/11 (200m) located 3 km south of the small lake created by Kpong Dam in the Eastern Region of Ghana and 50 km north of Tema.

Airports in Ghana
2005 establishments in Ghana